Orit Abramovitz, also spelt Abramovich, is an Israeli athlete. She won a gold medal in the high jump at the 1974 Asian Games.

References

Israeli female high jumpers
Asian Games gold medalists for Israel
Asian Games medalists in athletics (track and field)
Athletes (track and field) at the 1974 Asian Games
Medalists at the 1974 Asian Games
Living people
Year of birth missing (living people)